Donnell Robins (7 March 1934 – 8 December 2013) was a cricketer who played first-class cricket for South Australia from 1964-65 to 1966-67.

Career
In the 1965-66 season, playing in Adelaide for South Australia against New South Wales in the Sheffield Shield, Robins performed the rare feat of taking four wickets in four balls. He took a hat-trick to end the New South Wales first innings, then dismissed Bob Simpson with the first ball of the second innings.

He took 6 for 62 in the first innings of that match, then took 6 for 58 when South Australia played New South Wales in Sydney later that season. Between those two matches he hit his highest score of 44 against Queensland in Brisbane.

He finished the 1965-66 season with 30 wickets at 29.30. After a few unsuccessful matches in 1966-67 he played no more first-class cricket.

References

External links
 Donn Robins at Cricinfo
 Donn Robins at Cricket Archive

1934 births
2013 deaths
Australian cricketers
South Australia cricketers
Cricketers from New South Wales
People from Broken Hill, New South Wales